This article is about the demographic features of the population of Botswana, including population density, ethnicity, education level, health of the populace, economic status, religious affiliations and other aspects of the population.

Botswana, like many nations in southern Africa, suffers from a high HIV infection rate, estimated among adults ages 15 to 49 to be 20.7%.

Population

Census results

Bechuanaland Protectorate
The seven censuses of Botswana before its independence happened irregularly. Due to the Anglo-Boer War, the first census of Bechuanaland Protectorate, originally set to occur in 1901, took place on 17 April 1904. The 1931 census was postponed to 1936 because of the Great Depression. The early censuses were unreliable and took several years to tabulate; the results were outdated by the time they were calculated.

Post-independence
There have been six censuses after the independence of Botswana, each occurring every ten years in the year ending in 1 (i.e. 1971, 1981, 1991, 2001, 2011 and 2022). The 1971 census was the first census in Botswana to use de facto enumeration; this method counts people based on how many people spent census night at a specific location. Previously, the citizens were counted based on their usual place of residence. The 2001 census was the first census in Botswana to comply with the SADC 2000 Census Project, the guidelines of which unify the demographic statistics in southern Africa. The  2011 Census was the fifth census after independence  the 2011 Botswana Population and Housing Census, it occurred in August 2011. The most recent sixth  and most recent census is the 2022 Population and Housing Census which was carried out in April 2022.

UN estimates
The proportion of children below the age of 15 in 2020 was about 33.4%, 62.1% were between 15 and 65 years of age, while 4.5% of the population were 65 years or older.

Population Estimates by Sex and Age Group (01.VII.2020):

Vital statistics

United Nations estimates 
Registration of vital events is in Botswana not complete. The Population Department of the United Nations prepared the following estimates. Population estimates account for under numeration in population censuses.

Births and deaths

Source: Vital Statistics Report 2012.

Life expectancy at birth
Life expectancy from 1950 to 2020 (UN World Population Prospects):

Ethnic groups

Tswana 79%, Kalanga 11%, Basarwa 3%, Other 7% (including Kgalagadi, Indians and Whites).

Languages

Setswana 77.3%, Kalanga 7.4%, Sekgalagadi 3.4%, English 2.8%, Shona 2.0%, Sesarwa 1.7%, Sehambukushu 1.6%, Ndebele 1.0%, Others 2.8%. (2011 est.)

Religions

 Christian 79.1%, Badimo 4.1%, Other 1.4% (includes the Baháʼí Faith, Hindu, Islam, Rastafari), None 15.2%, Unspecified 0.3% (2011 est.)

Other demographic statistics 

Demographic statistics according to the World Population Review in 2022.

One birth every 10 minutes	
One death every 37 minutes	
One net migrant every 180 minutes	
Net gain of one person every 12 minutes

The following demographic statistics are from the CIA World Factbook.

Population
2,384,246 (2022 est.)
2,350,667 (July 2021 est.)
2,214,858 (July 2017 est.)

Religions
Christian 79.1%, Badimo 4.1%, other 1.4% (includes Baha'i, Hindu, Muslim, Rastafarian), none 15.2%, unspecified 0.3% (2011 est.)

Age structure

0-14 years: 30.54% (male 357,065/female 350,550)
15-24 years: 18.31% (male 208,824/female 215,462)
25-54 years: 39.67% (male 434,258/female 484,922)
55-64 years: 5.92% (male 59,399/female 77,886)
65 years and over: 5.56% (male 53,708/female 75,159) (2020 est.)

Total fertility rate
2.39 children born/woman (2022 est.) Country comparison to the world: 74th
The total fertility rate is 2.42 children born/woman (2021 est.) Country comparison to the world: 74th

Population growth rate
1.4% (2022 est.) Country comparison to the world: 68th
1.43% (2021 est.) Country comparison to the world: 67th
1.55% (2017 est.)

Birth rate
20.28 births/1,000 population (2022 est.) Country comparison to the world: 70th
20.6 births/1,000 population (2021 est.) Country comparison to the world: 71st
22.1 births/1,000 population (2017 est.)

Death rate
9.05 deaths/1,000 population (2022 est.) Country comparison to the world: 59th
9.12 deaths/1,000 population (2021 est.) Country comparison to the world: 61st
9.6 deaths/1,000 population (2017 est.)

Median age
Total: 25.7 years. Country comparison to the world: 157th
Male: 24.5 years 
Female: 26.7 years (2020 est.)

Total: 24.5 years
Male: 23.5 years
Female: 25.6 years (2017 est.)

Net migration rate
2.81 migrant(s)/1,000 population (2022 est.) Country comparison to the world: 41st
2.85 migrants/1,000 population (2021 est.) Country comparison to the world: 38th

Urbanization
urban population: 72.2% of total population (2022)
rate of urbanization: 2.47% annual rate of change (2020-25 est.)

Urban population: 70.9% of total population (2020)
Rate of urbanization: 2.87% annual rate of change (2015–20 est.)

Sex ratio
At birth: 1.03 male(s)/female
0-14 years: 1.02 male(s)/female
15-24 years: 0.97 male(s)/female
25-54 years: 0.9 male(s)/female
55-64 years: 0.76 male(s)/female
65 years and over: 0.71 male(s)/female
Total population: 0.93 male(s)/female (2020 est.)

Life expectancy at birth
total population: 65.64 years
male: 63.6 years
female: 67.74 years (2022 est.) Country comparison to the world: 200th

Total population: 65.2 years
Male: 63.2 years
Female: 67.3 years (2021 est.)

Contraceptive prevalence rate
67.4% (2017)

Maternal mortality rate
144 deaths/100,000 live births (2017 est.) Country comparison to the world: 59th

HIV/AIDS

Adult prevalence rate: 22.2% (2019 est.)
People living with HIV/AIDS: 380,000 (2019 est.)
Deaths due to AIDS: 5,000 (2019 est.) Country comparison to the world: 25th

Physicians density
0.53 physicians/1,000 population (2016)

Hospital bed density
1.8 beds/1,000 population (2010)

Obesity - adult prevalence rate
18.9% (2016)

Major infectious diseases
Degree of risk: high (2020)
Food or waterborne diseases: bacterial diarrhea, hepatitis A, and typhoid fever
Vectorborne disease: malaria

Nationality
Noun: Motswana (singular), Batswana (plural)
Adjective: Motswana (singular), Batswana (plural)

Literacy
Definition: age 15 and over can read and write
Total population: 88.5%
Male: 88%
Female: 88.9% (2015 est.)

Education expenditure
8.7% of total GDP (2007)

Sanitation facility access
Improved: 
Urban: 92.9% of population
Rural: 60.8% of population
Total: 82.8% of population

Unimproved: 
Urban: 7.1% of population
Rural: 39.2% of population
Total: 17.2% of population (2017 est.)

Migrants

According to the United Nations, there were 110,596 international migrants in Botswana in 2019.  Their most common countries of origin were as follows:

References

Botswana Demographics 2001 Central Statistics Office (Botswana), Census and Demographic Statistics for the year 2001.